Newry is an unincorporated community in Jackson County, Indiana, in the United States.

History 

Newry was never legally platted. A post office was established at Newry in 1846, and remained in operation until it was discontinued in 1860. One of the first mills in Vernon Township was built in Newry.

References 

Unincorporated communities in Jackson County, Indiana
Unincorporated communities in Indiana